Richard Skinner (May 30, 1778May 23, 1833) was an American politician, attorney, and jurist who served as the ninth governor of Vermont.

Biography
Skinner was born in Litchfield, Connecticut, the son of Timothy Skinner and Susanna Marsh Skinner.  Judge Roger Skinner was his brother.  Richard Skinner completed preparatory studies and graduated from Litchfield Law School.  He was admitted to the bar in 1800, and began a practice in Manchester, Vermont. He married Fanny Pierpont and they had four children, including prominent Illinois politician Mark Skinner.  Among the prospective attorneys who learned the law in Skinner's office was Pierpoint Isham, who served as a justice of the Vermont Supreme Court from 1851 to 1856.

Career
In 1801, Skinner became the state's attorney for Bennington County, a position he held until 1813. From 1805 to 1813, Skinner was probate judge for the Manchester district.

In the 1812 elections, Skinner was elected as a Democratic-Republican to the U.S. House of Representatives for Vermont's new created 5th District. He served a single two-year term (the 13th Congress) from March 4, 1813, to March 3, 1815.  Skinner lost in the 1814 election to the 14th Congress and returned to Vermont to resume the practice of law.

Skinner became a Judge on the Vermont Supreme Court in 1815 and 1816; he succeeded Asa Aldis as chief justice in 1816, but declined reappointment to the post in 1817. He was a member of the Vermont House of Representatives in 1815 and 1818, serving as Speaker in the latter year.

In 1819, Skinner briefly returned to his former position of Bennington County state's attorney. The same year, he was elected Governor of Vermont, and served from 1820 until 1823, when he became the Chief Justice on the Vermont Supreme Court. Skinner held this position until 1828, when he retired from public life.

Skinner was interested in public education and served as president of the northeastern branch of the American Educational Society and a trustee of Middlebury College.

Death
Skinner died in Manchester and is interred at Dellwood Cemetery, Manchester, Bennington County, Vermont.

References

External links
 

National Governors Association
The Political Graveyard

Litchfield Historical Society

1778 births
1833 deaths
Governors of Vermont
Members of the Vermont House of Representatives
Litchfield Law School alumni
People from Middlebury, Vermont
Vermont state court judges
Vermont lawyers
State's attorneys in Vermont
Justices of the Vermont Supreme Court
Democratic-Republican Party members of the United States House of Representatives from Vermont
Democratic-Republican Party state governors of the United States
People from Manchester, Vermont
19th-century American lawyers